Mount Kerkeslin is a  mountain summit located in the Athabasca River valley of Jasper National Park, in the Canadian Rockies of Alberta, Canada. It is the highest peak of the Maligne Range. It is located in the south part of the Maligne Range, east of the Icefields Parkway and is visible from the Athabasca Falls lookout. Mount Kerkeslin is composed of sedimentary rock laid down during the Cambrian period and pushed east and over the top of younger rock during the Laramide orogeny.

The mountain was named in 1859 by James Hector during the Palliser expedition but the source of the name is not known.

Climate
Based on the Köppen climate classification, Mount Kerkeslin is located in a subarctic climate with cold, snowy winters, and mild summers.

See also
 Geography of Alberta

References

External links
 Parks Canada web site: Jasper National Park
 Mount Kerkeslin weather: Mountain Forecast

Kerkeslin
Kerkeslin
Kerkeslin
Kerkeslin